The Rural Municipality of Laurier No. 38 is a rural municipality (RM) in the Canadian province of Saskatchewan within Census Division No. 2 and  Division No. 2. it is located in the southeast portion of the province.

History 
The RM of Laurier No. 38 incorporated as a rural municipality on December 13, 1909.

Heritage properties
There are two historical buildings located within the RM.
Soda Lake School - Constructed in 1914, as a one room school the building now houses the Soda Lake Community Centre in Soda Lake.  The school operated from 1914 until 1953.
Souris Valley Church - Constructed in 1907 as a Catholic church St. Germaine Parish of the Archdiocese of St. Boniface the church in Souris Valley.  The church closed in 1970 and the building has since been operated as the Souris Valley Co-operative Memorial Club.  The building has also been called the St. Germaine Roman Catholic Church.

Geography

Communities and localities 
The following urban municipalities are surrounded by the RM.

Towns
 Radville

The following unincorporated communities are within the RM.

Localities
 Dandonneau
 Neptune
 Souris Valley

Brooking, a ghost town, is also within the RM.

Demographics 

Government 
The RM of Laurier No. 38 is governed by an elected municipal council and an appointed administrator that meets on the second Tuesday of every month. The reeve of the RM is Gene Gilmore while its administrator is Ursula Scott. The RM's office is located in Radville.

Transportation  
The Radville Airport is located within the municipality.

Gallery

References 

Laurier

Division No. 2, Saskatchewan